Hovig Demirjian (born 3 January 1989), also known by the mononym Hovig, is an Armenian-Cypriot singer. He represented Cyprus in the Eurovision Song Contest 2017 with the song "Gravity", finishing in 21st place.

Life and career
Demirjian or Demirdjian was born on 3 January 1989 in Nicosia, Cyprus, and is of Armenian descent. He studied marketing and worked in business, but quickly gave up in order to become a singer. He learned to play the guitar and piano and also studied jazz and vocals. His first major achievement was placing second in a musical competition in Larnaca. He became well known in Cyprus with the nickname "The Music Messenger". On June 1, 2009, he released "Den mou milas alithina (Istoria exei teleiwsei)" (in Greek "Δεν μού μιλάς - ιστορία έχει τελειώσει") under the mononym Hovig accompanied by a music video in preparation for the Greek X Factor. The song was written by Argiro Christodoulidou and music video directed by Kostas Voniatis.

Greek X Factor
In 2009, Demirjian took part in the second season of The X Factor Greece broadcast on the Greek television station ANT1. He auditioned with the Greek song "Pote" (in Greek "Ποτέ") and qualified for the Boys (16-24) category mentored by Nikos Mouratidis. In the inaugural live show, he sang "How to Save a Life" from The Fray and in second week the Armenian-themed "Menos ektos" from Eleftheria Arvanitaki. In week 3 of the live shows he sang "Unchain My Heart" from Ray Charles and Joe Cocker followed by Bon Jovi's "You Give Love a Bad Name in week 4 and "With a Little Help from My Friends" from The Beatles and Joe Cocker in week 5. He continued with various interpretations like "(I Can't Get No) Satisfaction" from The Rolling Stones, "Feel from Robbie Williams and "You Can Leave Your Hat On" again from Cocker and "It's a Man's Man's Man's World". In the 11th live show, he performed two songs: the Greek-language "Pou Na Sai" from Andonis Remos and "Hello" from Lionel Richie. He ended up finishing in seventh place in the competition.

After X Factor
After X factor, he returned to Cyprus developing a solo music career. He released a number of singles including the Greek-language songs "Ksana" (in Greek Ξανά) in 2010, "Mystika" (in Greek Μυστικά) in 2012 and "Ekho ya mena" (in Greek "Εγω Για Μένα") in 2013. He also toured internationally performing in various concerts in Greece, the Middle East and Russia.

Eurovision Song Contest
Following The X Factor Greece, Demirjian competed to represent Cyprus in the Eurovision Song Contest on two occasions; 2010 and 2015. In 2010, he placed third with "Goodbye", and in 2015, he placed fourth with "Stone in a River".

On 21 October 2016, Demirjian was announced as the Cypriot entrant in the Eurovision Song Contest 2017. His song was written by Swedish composer Thomas G:son who now lives in Cyprus. The song is called "Gravity" which was released on March 1, 2017. He performed in the first semifinal of the contest and qualified to the final, where he placed twenty-first. The following year he was the Cypriot spokesperson, giving twelve points to Sweden's Benjamin Ingrosso and his song "Dance You Off".

Discography

Singles

References

External links 
Hovig Demirjian Official website

YouTube Hovig channel 

1989 births
Living people
People from Nicosia
Cypriot pop singers
21st-century Cypriot male singers
Eurovision Song Contest entrants for Cyprus
Eurovision Song Contest entrants of 2017
Cypriot people of Armenian descent
The X Factor contestants